The Costa Rican Athletics Federation  (FECOA; Federación Costarricense de Atletismo) is the governing body for the sport of athletics in Costa Rica.  Current president is Geen Clarke.

History 

FECOA was founded in 1960.

Affiliations 
FECOA is the national member federation for Costa Rica in the following international organisations:
International Association of Athletics Federations (IAAF)
North American, Central American and Caribbean Athletic Association (NACAC)
Association of Panamerican Athletics (APA)
Asociación Iberoamericana de Atletismo (AIA; Ibero-American Athletics Association)
Central American and Caribbean Athletic Confederation (CACAC)
Confederación Atlética del Istmo Centroamericano (CADICA; Central American Isthmus Athletic Confederation)
Moreover, it is part of the following national organisations:
Costa Rican National Olympic Committee (CONCRC; Comité Olímpico Nacional de Costa Rica)

National records 
FECOA maintains the Costa Rican records in athletics.

External links 
 
FECOA on Facebook

References 

Costa Rica
Athletics
Athletics in Costa Rica
National governing bodies for athletics
Sports organizations established in 1960